opened in Wakkanai, Hokkaidō, Japan in 2018. The display documents the history of Karafuto and its connections with the area and includes materials relating to the Chihaku ferry.

See also
 Wakkanai Park
 Evacuation of Karafuto and Kuriles

References

External links

 Wakkanai Karafuto Museum

Wakkanai, Hokkaido
Museums in Hokkaido
Karafuto
Museums established in 2018
2018 establishments in Japan
History museums in Japan